Punta Stilo Lighthouse is an active lighthouse on the Ionian Sea along the coast of Calabria in the municipality of Monasterace, Italy.

Description
The work to build the tower started in 1891 and the light was lit the first time in May 1895. The tower, attached to 1-storey keeper's house, has an octagonal prism shape and it is built in masonry. The light is operated by the Lighthouses Service of Marina Militare identified by the code number 3388 E.F.

See also
List of lighthouses in Italy

References

External links

 Servizio Fari Marina Militare 

Lighthouses in Italy
Buildings and structures in Reggio Calabria